The Claremont Courier is a community newspaper based in Claremont, California, United States. It is widely regarded as the city's newspaper of record, and is often cited by other news outlets covering the city. In 2018, the Courier was named the top community newspaper in California by the California News Publishers Association. It publishes an annual almanac and is known for its aerial videography.

History
The paper was founded by E.B. Young, who published the first edition on September 16, 1908. Tobias Larson purchased it in 1911, and his son Stanley took over in 1936. It was purchased by Martin Weinberger in 1955 and in 2007 was transferred to his son, Peter Weinberger.

Coverage 
The Courier publishes an annual almanac and is known for its aerial videography.

Recognition 

In 2018, the Courier was named the top community newspaper in California by the California News Publishers Association.

References

External links
 Website

Mass media in the Inland Empire
Pomona Valley
Claremont, California
Newspapers established in 1908
Daily newspapers published in Greater Los Angeles